The basilica of Saint-Pierre-aux-Nonnains  in Metz, France is one of the oldest churches in Europe.
The building began life in the 4th century when Metz was an important Gallo-Roman city.

History
The building belonged to one of several thermae (public baths complexes) which existed in Metz in Roman times. Some sources describe it as having been a gymnasium. In the 7th century, the structure was converted into a church, becoming the chapel of a Benedictine nunnery. A new nave was constructed in the 11th century with further interior renovations. 

In the 16th century Metz was besieged by the troops of Charles V and later was converted into an important garrison town by the French. The building became a warehouse, and remained so after being declared a historical monument in 1909.  In the 1970s it was restored and opened for concerts and exhibitions.

Burials
Drogo of Champagne

See also
Oldest churches in the world

References

Buildings and structures in Metz
Monuments historiques of Grand Est
Roman Catholic churches in Metz
Ancient Roman baths in France
Ancient Roman buildings and structures in France
Tourist attractions in Metz
Burial sites of the Pippinids